In geometry, a cantellation is a 2nd-order truncation in any dimension that bevels a regular polytope at its edges and at its vertices, creating a new facet in place of each edge and of each vertex. Cantellation also applies to regular tilings and honeycombs. Cantellating a polyhedron is also rectifying its rectification.

Cantellation (for polyhedra and tilings) is also called expansion by Alicia Boole Stott: it corresponds to moving the faces of the regular form away from the center, and filling in a new face in the gap for each opened edge and for each opened vertex.

Notation 
A cantellated polytope is represented by an extended Schläfli symbol t0,2{p,q,...} or r or rr{p,q,...}.

For polyhedra, a cantellation offers a direct sequence from a regular polyhedron to its dual.

Example: cantellation sequence between cube and octahedron:

Example: a cuboctahedron is a cantellated tetrahedron.

For higher-dimensional polytopes, a cantellation offers a direct sequence from a regular polytope to its birectified form.

Examples: cantellating polyhedra, tilings

See also 
 Uniform polyhedron
 Uniform 4-polytope
 Chamfer (geometry)

References 
 Coxeter, H.S.M. Regular Polytopes, (3rd edition, 1973), Dover edition,  (pp.145-154 Chapter 8: Truncation, p 210 Expansion)
 Norman Johnson Uniform Polytopes, Manuscript (1991)
 N.W. Johnson: The Theory of Uniform Polytopes and Honeycombs, Ph.D. Dissertation, University of Toronto, 1966

External links 
 

Polyhedra
4-polytopes